Yves Crettenand (born 29 April 1963) is a French former ice hockey left winger. He competed in the men's tournament at the 1992 Winter Olympics.

References

External links

1963 births
Living people
Brûleurs de Loups players
Chamonix HC players
Diables Rouges de Briançon players
Dragons de Rouen players
French ice hockey left wingers
Ice hockey players at the 1992 Winter Olympics
Olympic ice hockey players of France
People from Chamonix
Sportspeople from Haute-Savoie